Copicut Woods is a nature reserve and forest located in Fall River, Massachusetts.  The property was acquired by The Trustees of Reservations in 2002.  It is a component of the 13,600 acre Southeastern Massachusetts Bioreserve.

References

External links 
 Copicut Woods - Trustees of Reservations website
 Trail map

Fall River, Massachusetts
The Trustees of Reservations
Open space reserves of Massachusetts
Protected areas of Bristol County, Massachusetts
Forests of Massachusetts
Tourist attractions in Fall River, Massachusetts
Protected areas established in 2002
2002 establishments in Massachusetts